Natasha Rhodes (now Natasha Rohner) (born 8 April 1978) is an English-born author, best known for her contemporary fantasy book series starring supernatural crime-fighter Kayla Steele. She has also written many film novelizations of popular blockbuster movies such as Blade: Trinity and the Final Destination series of movies, as well as original books based on films such as the Nightmare On Elm Street series.

Personal life 
Rhodes was born in Kent, England in 1978. Her education includes a BA Honors degree from the Newport University, Wales (UWCN). She was most notably involved in the post-production of cult Indie hit Cop on the Edge IX: A Prelude to Justice, a full-length underground movie spoof produced by Coten Films and directed by Edward Keaton, who at the time was studying under the tutorage of British Filmmaker Allan Niblo at Newport Film School; Niblo later went on to produce cult movies such as Human Traffic. Released locally, the movie won the coveted student award for getting the crew the most suspensions from using the University film equipment.

Rhodes currently lives in Orange County, California, with her husband Criss 6, former bassist of glam metal band Pretty Boy Floyd and Mötley Crüe tribute band True 2 Crue.

Works 
After graduating from the University of Wales in Newport with a BA Honors Degree in Film Production, Rhodes was hired to write official movie novelizations for Black Flame, an imprint of BL Publishing, the publishing arm of UK gaming giant Games Workshop.

Between 2004–2010, Rhodes penned eight original novels and movie-based novelizations for BL Publishing to support her post-University travels around America. Inspired by the colorful local characters she met in Hollywood, she wrote her first original novel Dante's Girl at the age of 28, the first part of a three-book series following the life of supernatural crime-fighter Kayla Steele. Her supernatural trilogy was set on the streets of Los Angeles and was published by Solaris Books, an imprint which focuses on science fiction, fantasy and dark fantasy novels and anthologies to showcase both established and new authors. The series was distributed to the U.K. and U.S. booktrade via local divisions of Simon & Schuster.

Her most recent work was a short horror story set in the world of the Los Angeles heavy metal scene. It was published as part of an anthology of new horror writers in The End of the Line: An Anthology of Underground Horror by Rebellion Books.

Rhodes currently works at BlackBerry Limited as Senior Managing Editor of two digital publications: ThreatVector, an award-winning cybersecurity blog, and PHI Magazine, BlackBerry's bi-annual print publication focusing on the past, present and future of artificial intelligence and machine learning in the information security industry.

Official movie novelizations 
 Blade: Trinity (October 2004)
 Final Destination: Dead Reckoning (2005)
 Final Destination I: The Movie (2006) Final Destination II: The Movie (2006, co-written with Nancy A. Collins)
 A Nightmare On Elm Street: Perchance to Dream (February 2006)

 Kayla Steele series 
 Dante's Girl (March 2007)
 The Last Angel (July 2008)
 Circus of Sins (May 2010)

Short stories
 The End of the Line: An Anthology of Underground Horror'' (October 2010) (Contributor of Short Story: "Crazy Train")

Interviews 
 SciFi Blog interview with Natasha about the portrayal of women in fantasy books
 Interview with Natasha Rhodes on ScifiChick.com
 Interview on Author David H. Burton's popular blog 'Random Musings'
 Natasha Rhodes interviewed about 'Circus Of Sins' on Mookychick.com
 Barnes and Nobel Review of 'Circus of Sins'
 Kayla Steele Series Review

References

External links
Natasha Rhodes: Official Author Website
 
 Natasha Rhodes at Library of Congress Authorities

1978 births
Living people
English fantasy writers
English horror writers